Batocera magica is a species of beetle in the family Cerambycidae. It was described by Thomson in 1859. It is known from Java and the Philippines.

References

Batocerini
Beetles described in 1859